In computing, Open Data Protocol (OData) is an open  protocol that allows the creation and consumption of queryable and interoperable REST  APIs in a simple and standard way. Microsoft initiated OData in 2007. Versions 1.0, 2.0, and 3.0 are released under the Microsoft Open Specification Promise. Version 4.0 was standardized at OASIS, with a release in March 2014. In April 2015 OASIS submitted OData v4 and OData JSON Format v4 to ISO/IEC JTC 1 for approval as an international standard. In December 2016, ISO/IEC published OData 4.0 Core as ISO/IEC 20802-1:2016 and the OData JSON Format as ISO/IEC 20802-2:2016.

The protocol enables the creation and consumption of  REST APIs, which allow  Web clients to publish and edit resources, identified using URLs and defined in a data model, using simple HTTP messages. OData shares some similarities with JDBC and with ODBC; like ODBC, OData is not limited to relational databases.

Standardization
After initial development by Microsoft, OData became a standardized protocol of the OASIS OData Technical Committee (TC).

OASIS OData Technical Committee
"The OASIS OData TC works to simplify the querying and sharing of data across disparate applications and multiple stakeholders for re-use in the enterprise, Cloud, and mobile devices. A REST-based protocol, OData builds on HTTP, AtomPub, and JSON using URIs to address and access data feed resources. It enables information to be accessed from a variety of sources including (but not limited to) relational databases, file systems, content management systems, and traditional Web sites. OData provides a way to break down data silos and increase the shared value of data by creating an ecosystem in which data consumers can interoperate with data producers in a way that is far more powerful than currently possible, enabling more applications to make sense of a broader set of data. Every producer and consumer of data that participates in this ecosystem increases its overall value."

TC participants include CA Technologies, Citrix Systems, IBM, Microsoft, Progress Software, Red Hat, SAP SE and SDL.

Architecture
OData is a protocol for the creation and consumption of RESTful APIs. Thus, as common practices of REST, OData builds on HTTP, AtomPub, and JSON using URIs to address and access data feed resources.

Resource identification
OData uses URIs to identify resources. For every OData service whose service root is abbreviated as http://host/service/, the following fixed resources can be found:

The service document 
The service document lists entity sets, functions, and singletons that can be retrieved. Clients can use the service document to navigate the model in a hypermedia-driven fashion.

The service document is available at http://host/service/.

The metadata document 
The metadata document describes the types, sets, functions and actions understood by the OData service. Clients can use the metadata document to understand how to query and interact with entities in the service.

The metadata document is available at http://host/service/$metadata.

Dynamic resources 
The URIs for the dynamic resources may be computed from the hypermedia information in the service document and metadata document.

Resource operation 
OData uses the HTTP verbs to indicate the operations on the resources.
 GET: Get the resource (a collection of entities, a single entity, a structural property, a navigation property, a stream, etc.).
 POST: Create a new resource.
 PUT: Update an existing resource by replacing it with a complete instance.
 PATCH: Update an existing resource by replacing part of its properties with a partial instance.
 DELETE: Remove the resource.

Querying 
URLs requested from an OData endpoint may include query options. The OData protocol specifies various 'system query options' endpoints should accept, these can be used to filter, order, map or paginate data. 

Query options can be appended to a URL after a ? character and are separated by & characters; each option consists of a $-sign prefixed name and its value, separated by a = sign, for example: OData/Products?$top=2&$orderby=Name. A number of logical operators and functions are defined for use when filtering data, for example: OData/Products?$filter=Price lt 10.00 and startswith(Name,'M') requests products with a price smaller than 10 and a name starting with the letter 'M'.

Resource representation 
OData uses different formats for representing data and the data model. In OData protocol version 4.0, JSON format is the standard for representing data, with the Atom format still being in committee specification stage. For representing the data model, the Common Schema Definition Language (CSDL)  is used, which defines an XML representation of the entity data model exposed by OData services.

A sample OData JSON data payload 
A collection of products:
{
  "@odata.context": "http://services.odata.org/V4/OData/OData.svc/$metadata#Products",
  "value": [
    {
      "ID": 0,
      "Name": "Meat",
      "Description": "Red Meat",
      "ReleaseDate": "1992-01-01T00:00:00Z",
      "DiscontinuedDate": null,
      "Rating": 14,
      "Price": 2.5
    },
    {
      "ID": 1,
      "Name": "Milk",
      "Description": "Low fat milk",
      "ReleaseDate": "1995-10-01T00:00:00Z",
      "DiscontinuedDate": null,
      "Rating": 3,
      "Price": 3.5
    },
    ...
  ]
}

A sample OData Atom data payload 
A collection of products:
<feed xml:base="http://services.odata.org/V4/OData/OData.svc/" m:context="http://services.odata.org/V4/OData/OData.svc/$metadata#Products" xmlns="http://www.w3.org/2005/Atom" xmlns:d="http://docs.oasis-open.org/odata/ns/data" xmlns:m="http://docs.oasis-open.org/odata/ns/metadata" xmlns:georss="http://www.georss.org/georss" xmlns:gml="http://www.opengis.net/gml">
  <id>http://services.odata.org/v4/odata/odata.svc/Products</id>
  <title type="text">Products</title>
  <updated>2015-05-19T03:38:50Z</updated>
  <link rel="self" title="Products" href="Products"/>
  <entry>
    <id>http://services.odata.org/V4/OData/OData.svc/Products(0)</id>
    <category term="#ODataDemo.Product" scheme="http://docs.oasis-open.org/odata/ns/scheme"/>
    <link rel="edit" title="Product" href="Products(0)"/>
    <link rel="http://docs.oasis-open.org/odata/ns/relatedlinks/Categories" type="application/xml" title="Categories" href="Products(0)/Categories/$ref"/>
    <link rel="http://docs.oasis-open.org/odata/ns/related/Categories" type="application/atom+xml;type=feed" title="Categories" href="Products(0)/Categories"/>
    <link rel="http://docs.oasis-open.org/odata/ns/relatedlinks/Supplier" type="application/xml" title="Supplier" href="Products(0)/Supplier/$ref"/>
    <link rel="http://docs.oasis-open.org/odata/ns/related/Supplier" type="application/atom+xml;type=entry" title="Supplier" href="Products(0)/Supplier"/>
    <link rel="http://docs.oasis-open.org/odata/ns/relatedlinks/ProductDetail" type="application/xml" title="ProductDetail" href="Products(0)/ProductDetail/$ref"/>
    <link rel="http://docs.oasis-open.org/odata/ns/related/ProductDetail" type="application/atom+xml;type=entry" title="ProductDetail" href="Products(0)/ProductDetail"/>
    <title/>
    <updated>2015-05-19T03:38:50Z</updated>
    <author>
      <name/>
    </author>
    <content type="application/xml">
      <m:properties>
        <d:ID m:type="Int32">0</d:ID>
        <d:Name>Bread</d:Name>
        <d:Description>Whole grain bread</d:Description>
        <d:ReleaseDate m:type="DateTimeOffset">1992-01-01T00:00:00Z</d:ReleaseDate>
        <d:DiscontinuedDate m:null="true"/>
        <d:Rating m:type="Int16">4</d:Rating>
        <d:Price m:type="Double">2.5</d:Price>
      </m:properties>
    </content>
  </entry>
  <entry>
    <id>http://services.odata.org/V4/OData/OData.svc/Products(1)</id>
    <category term="#ODataDemo.Product" scheme="http://docs.oasis-open.org/odata/ns/scheme"/>
    <link rel="edit" title="Product" href="Products(1)"/>
    <link rel="http://docs.oasis-open.org/odata/ns/relatedlinks/Categories" type="application/xml" title="Categories" href="Products(1)/Categories/$ref"/>
    <link rel="http://docs.oasis-open.org/odata/ns/related/Categories" type="application/atom+xml;type=feed" title="Categories" href="Products(1)/Categories"/>
    <link rel="http://docs.oasis-open.org/odata/ns/relatedlinks/Supplier" type="application/xml" title="Supplier" href="Products(1)/Supplier/$ref"/>
    <link rel="http://docs.oasis-open.org/odata/ns/related/Supplier" type="application/atom+xml;type=entry" title="Supplier" href="Products(1)/Supplier"/>
    <link rel="http://docs.oasis-open.org/odata/ns/relatedlinks/ProductDetail" type="application/xml" title="ProductDetail" href="Products(1)/ProductDetail/$ref"/>
    <link rel="http://docs.oasis-open.org/odata/ns/related/ProductDetail" type="application/atom+xml;type=entry" title="ProductDetail" href="Products(1)/ProductDetail"/>
    <title/>
    <updated>2015-05-19T03:38:50Z</updated>
    <author>
      <name/>
    </author>
    <content type="application/xml">
      <m:properties>
        <d:ID m:type="Int32">1</d:ID>
        <d:Name>Milk</d:Name>
        <d:Description>Low fat milk</d:Description>
        <d:ReleaseDate m:type="DateTimeOffset">1995-10-01T00:00:00Z</d:ReleaseDate>
        <d:DiscontinuedDate m:null="true"/>
        <d:Rating m:type="Int16">3</d:Rating>
        <d:Price m:type="Double">3.5</d:Price>
      </m:properties>
    </content>
  </entry>
  ...
</feed>

A sample OData metadata document 
<edmx:Edmx Version="4.0" xmlns:edmx="http://docs.oasis-open.org/odata/ns/edmx">
  <edmx:DataServices>
    <Schema Namespace="ODataDemo" xmlns="http://docs.oasis-open.org/odata/ns/edm">
      <EntityType Name="Product">
        <Key>
          <PropertyRef Name="ID"/>
        </Key>
        <Property Name="ID" Type="Edm.Int32" Nullable="false"/>
        <Property Name="Name" Type="Edm.String"/>
        <Property Name="Description" Type="Edm.String"/>
        <Property Name="ReleaseDate" Type="Edm.DateTimeOffset" Nullable="false"/>
        <Property Name="DiscontinuedDate" Type="Edm.DateTimeOffset"/>
        <Property Name="Rating" Type="Edm.Int16" Nullable="false"/>
        <Property Name="Price" Type="Edm.Double" Nullable="false"/>
      </EntityType>

      <ComplexType Name="Address">
        <Property Name="Street" Type="Edm.String"/>
        <Property Name="City" Type="Edm.String"/>
        <Property Name="State" Type="Edm.String"/>
        <Property Name="ZipCode" Type="Edm.String"/>
        <Property Name="Country" Type="Edm.String"/>
      </ComplexType>
      
      <EntityContainer Name="DemoService">
        <EntitySet Name="Products" EntityType="ODataDemo.Product"></EntitySet>
      </EntityContainer>
    </Schema>
  </edmx:DataServices>
</edmx:Edmx>

Ecosystem

The ecosystem of OData consists of the client/server libraries that implement the protocol, and applications that are based on the protocol.

Libraries
There are a number of OData libraries available to access/produce OData APIs:

.NET 
 Server and client: Microsoft's OData .NET libraries
 Client: Simple.OData.Client

Java 
 Server and client: Apache Olingo
 Server side: Jello-Framework
 Client: odata-client

JavaScript 
 Client: Apache Olingo (featured by OASIS)
 Client: data.js
 Client: JayData for higher level of abstraction (LINQ-like syntax, support for OData geo features, IndexedDB, WebSQL, integration for DevExtreme, Kendo UI, Angular.js, Knockout.js and Sencha). 
 Client: OpenUI5 library maintained by SAP
 Client (Node.js): JayData for node
 Client: Breeze
 Client: OData4 and Invantive Bridge Online
 Client: odata-fluent-query: a JavaScript OData query language parser
 Server: node-odata

PHP 
 Client: odataphp
 Server: POData

Python 
 Client: PyOData
 Server and client: Pyslet

Ruby  
 Client: ruby_odata library
 Client: Free OData V4.0 Library for Ruby
 Server: Safrano

Others 
Other languages implemented include:
 AJAX: ASP.NET Ajax Library for getting to OData.
 C++: odatacpp_client is a client-side-only implementation of the OData protocol.
 Windward Studios supports OData in their Reporting & Document Generation Solutions.
 Reporting tool List & Label has a specialized data provider for OData.
 Blackberry (C++): OData-BB10 Open Data Protocol (OData) library for BlackBerry 10 (BB10) Cascades apps

Applications 
Applications include:
  Progress DataDirect Hybrid Data Pipeline can expose any cloud, big data or relational data sources as OData end points
 Socrata exposes an OData API.
 Microsoft Azure exposes an OData API.
 Oracle Analytics Cloud can connect to an OData API
 SAP NetWeaver Gateway provides OData access to SAP Business Suite and SAP Business Warehouse.
 IBM WebSphere eXtreme Scale REST data service can be accessed by any HTTP client using OData.
 Microsoft SharePoint 2010 and up can expose its data as OData endpoint
 Office 365 exposes OData V4.0 APIs.
 Salesforce Connect consumes OData APIs.
 Skyvia Connect exposes cloud and database data via OData
 Tableau can connect to OData APIs.
 TIBCO Spotfire can connect to OData APIs.
 Mulesoft helps integrate with OData APIs.
 SuccessFactors uses Odata APIs
 Ceridian HCM's Dayforce uses Odata
Redfish uses Odata

Tools 
 Nucleon Database Master

See also 
 GData – competing protocol from Google
 Resource Description Framework (RDF) – a similar concept by W3C
 GraphQL

References

External links
 Official website
 Develop Service-Oriented Applications with WCF
 OData Basics Presentation

OData OASIS Standards
 OData Version 4.0 Part 1: Protocol
 OData Version 4.0 Part 2: URL Conventions
 OData Version 4.0 Part 3: Common Schema Definition Language (CSDL)
 ABNF components - OData ABNF Construction Rules Version 4.0 and OData ABNF Test Cases
 Vocabulary components - OData Core Vocabulary and OData Measures Vocabulary
 XML Schemas - OData EDMX XML Schema and OData EDM XML Schema
 OData JSON Format Version 4.0

Committee Specifications
 OData Atom Format Version 4.0
 OData Extension for Data Aggregation Version 4.0

Committee Notes
 What's New in OData Version 4.0

Atom (Web standard)
Web syndication formats
XML-based standards
ISO/IEC standards